Fat Cat (born March 14, 1990), also known as Defconn Girl, is a South Korean singer.

Career
Fat Cat gained notice after appearing in the music video for rapper Defconn's song "How Rappers Break Up Part 2," as well as for her participation in live performances with him. Her debut single, "Indifferent Love", was released on September 24.

On September 25, she debuted on SBS' Inkigayo with "Indifferent Love" and impressed many viewers including choreographer Bae Sang Mi, who created her "Tik Tok" dance for the song.

Later on, drama production company Curtain Call Media signed her up for a joint management deal in November 2011.

On January 5, 2012, Fat Cat released her second single album, "Is Being Pretty Everything". On January 5, the music video was released after previously releasing two teasers, and the following day, she made her return on KBS Music Bank.

On March 9, 2012, Fat Cat released her third single, "It's Like a Dream," which she promoted on Korean music shows. However, Fat Cat was diagnosed with a kidney disorder resulting in idiopathic edema on March 11, 2012, causing her activities for "It's Like a Dream" to be halted while she was hospitalized.

Fat Cat spent some time recovering from her illness and expected to resume activities in November 2012 or early 2013.

In Oct 2012, Fat Cat signed a three-year contract with Japanese recording company Victor-JVC and Japanese artist management and record company Rainbow Entertainment in preparation for her debut in Japan. She debuted with the single "Make Up" in July 2013.

Personal life
She married in 2018.

Discography

Singles

MV
 Defconn – 래퍼들이 헤어지는 방법 (How to Leave a Rapper, Part 2)

Collaboration
 Paul Baek (폴백) – "Hello, my ex"

Modeling
 Vogue Girl
 Maxim

References

External links
 
   – Victor Entertainment
 

1990 births
Living people
K-pop singers
South Korean dance musicians
South Korean female idols
South Korean women pop singers
21st-century South Korean singers
21st-century South Korean women singers